The 2012 Meco Cup (formerly known as the MLP Nations Cup) is a women's ice hockey tournament that was held in Germany from January 3 to 8, 2012. Preliminary matches were held in five cities including: Bad Tölz, Füssen, Lindau, Miesbach, and Sonthofen, respectively. The gold and bronze medal games were both be contested at the Arena Füssen in Füssen, Germany.

Exhibition

Scoring summary

Schedule

Standings

 1. Sweden – 14 pts
 2. Finland – 11 pts
 3. Canada U22 – 11 pts
 4. Switzerland – 5 pts
 5. Germany – 3 pts
 6. Russia – 1 pts

References

2012–13
2012–13 in women's ice hockey
2012–13 in Swiss ice hockey
2012–13 in German ice hockey
2012–13 in Canadian women's ice hockey
2012–13 in Finnish ice hockey
2012–13 in Russian ice hockey
2012–13 in Swedish ice hockey
2012